North is one of the four multi-member constituencies of the Chamber of Deputies, the national legislature of Luxembourg. The constituency was established in 1919 following the introduction of proportional representation for elections to the Chamber of Deputies. It consists of the cantons of Clervaux, Diekirch, Redange, Vianden and Wiltz. The constituency currently elects nine of the 60 members of the Chamber of Deputies using the open party-list proportional representation electoral system. At the 2018 general election it had 47,223 registered electors.

Electoral system
North currently elects nine of the 60 members of the Chamber of Deputies using the open party-list proportional representation electoral system. Electors votes for candidates rather than parties and may cast as many votes as the number of deputies to be elected from the constituency. They may vote for an entire party list or individual candidates and may cast up to two votes for an individual candidate. If the party list contains fewer candidates than the number of deputies to be elected, the elector may vote for candidates from other lists as long as their total number of votes does not exceed the number of deputies to be elected. The ballot paper is invalidated if the elector cast more votes than the number of deputies to be elected from the constituency. Split-ticket voting (panachage) is permitted.

The votes received by each party's candidates are aggregated and seats are allocated to each party using the Hagenbach-Bischoff quota.

Election results

Summary

Detailed

2010s

2018
Results of the 2018 general election held on 14 October 2018:

The following candidates were elected:
André Bauler (DP), 9,227 votes; Emile Eicher (CSV), 12,956 votes; Jeff Engelen (ADR), 6,094 votes; Fernand Etgen (DP), 9,819 votes; Martine Hansen (CSV), 20,249 votes; Ali Kaes (CSV), 12,198 votes; Marco Schank (CSV), 14,096 votes; Romain Schneider (LSAP), 12,306 votes; and Claude Turmes (DG), 11,243 votes.

2013
Results of the 2013 general election held on 20 October 2013:

The following candidates were elected:
André Bauler (DP), 10,933 votes; Emile Eicher (CSV), 13,083 votes; Camille Gira (DG), 7,548 votes; Charles Goerens (DP), 17,523 votes; Claude Haagen (LSAP), 7,225 votes; Martine Hansen (CSV), 16,838 votes; Ali Kaes (CSV), 12,702 votes; Marco Schank (CSV), 17,174 votes; and Romain Schneider (LSAP), 12,389 votes.

2000s

2009
Results of the 2009 general election held on 7 June 2009:

The following candidates were elected:
André Bauler (DP), 7,169 votes; Jean Colombera (ADR), 5,110 votes; Fernand Etgen (DP), 10,423 votes; Camille Gira (DG), 9,441 votes; Marie-Josée Jacobs (CSV), 18,220 votes; Ali Kaes (CSV), 14,862 votes; Marco Schank (CSV), 16,760 votes; Romain Schneider (LSAP), 10,037 votes; and Lucien Weiler (CSV), 14,821 votes.

2004
Results of the 2004 general election held on 13 June 2004:

The following candidates were elected:
Emile Calmes (DP), 7,331 votes; Camille Gira (DG), 9,375 votes; Charles Goerens (DP), 16,788 votes; Marie-Josée Jacobs (CSV), 16,947 votes; Ali Kaes (CSV), 11,228 votes; Jean-Pierre Koepp (ADR), 8,245 votes; Marco Schank (CSV), 13,368 votes; Romain Schneider (LSAP), 6,508 votes; and Lucien Weiler (CSV), 10,957 votes.

1990s

1999
Results of the 1999 general election held on 13 June 1999:

The following candidates were elected:
Emile Calmes (DP), 9,488 votes; Jean Colombera (ADR), 5,000 votes; Camille Gira (DG), 7,707 votes; Charles Goerens (DP), 14,936 votes; Marie-Josée Jacobs (CSV), 13,700 votes; Jean-Pierre Koepp (ADR), 11,017 votes; Marco Schank (CSV), 9,407 votes; Lucien Weiler (CSV), 10,435 votes; and Georges Wohlfart (LSAP), 10,183 votes.

1994
Results of the 1994 general election held on 12 June 1994:

The following candidates were elected:
Emile Calmes (DP), 9,107 votes; Camille Gira (GLEI-GAP), 6,207 votes; Charles Goerens (DP), 14,196 votes; Marie-Josée Jacobs (CSV), 16,333 votes; Édouard Juncker (CSV), 11,791 votes; Jean-Pierre Koepp (ADR), 9,257 votes; Camille Weiler (LSAP), 6,450 votes; Lucien Weiler (CSV), 9,374 votes; and Georges Wohlfart (LSAP), 11,591 votes.

1980s

1989
Results of the 1989 general election held on 18 June 1989:

The following candidates were elected:
Emile Calmes (DP), 7,752 votes; Charles Goerens (DP), 11,207 votes; Marie-Josée Jacobs (CSV), 11,361 votes; Édouard Juncker (CSV), 11,957 votes; Jean-Pierre Koepp (5/6), 4,294 votes; Henri Mausen (CSV), 11,773 votes; René Steichen (CSV), 12,496 votes; Camille Weiler (LSAP), 7,612 votes; and Georges Wohlfart (LSAP), 8,226 votes.

1984
Results of the 1984 general election held on 17 June 1984:

The following candidates were elected:
Jean-Pierre Dichter (CSV), 14,074 votes; Charles Goerens (DP), 11,646 votes; René Hübsch (DP), 9,388 votes; Marie-Josée Jacobs (CSV), 12,249 votes; Édouard Juncker (CSV), 16,673 votes; René Steichen (CSV), 13,142 votes; Camille Weiler (LSAP), 8,451 votes; Lucien Weiler (CSV), 11,317 votes; and Georges Wohlfart (LSAP), 8,076 votes.

1970s

1979
Results of the 1979 general election held on 10 June 1979:

The following candidates were elected:
Victor Abens (LSAP), 9,230 votes; Henry Cravatte (SDP), 7,410 votes; Jean-Pierre Dichter (CSV), 11,312 votes; Emile Gerson (CSV), 11,521 votes; Charles Goerens (DP), 11,646 votes; René Hübsch (DP), 5,731 votes; Édouard Juncker (CSV), 14,832 votes; Camille Ney (CSV), 15,483 votes; and René Steichen (CSV), 11,733 votes.

1974
Results of the 1974 general election held on 26 May 1974:

The following candidates were elected:
Victor Abens (LSAP), 10,929 votes; Henry Cravatte (SDP), 9,679 votes; Emile Gerson (CSV), 12,305 votes; Frankie Hansen (LSAP), 7,831 votes; Édouard Juncker (CSV), 12,273 votes; Camille Ney (CSV), 16,126 votes; Alex Wantz (DP), 9,052 votes; Jean Winkin (CSV), 11,586 votes; and Frank Wolff (DP), 8,356 votes.

1960s

1968
Results of the 1968 general election held on 15 December 1968:

The following candidates were elected:
Victor Abens (LSAP), 11,744 votes; Jean-Pierre Büchler (CSV), 13,410 votes; Henry Cravatte (LSAP), 12,940 votes; Henri Diederich (DP), 6,289 votes; Emile Gerson (CSV), 12,121 votes; Frankie Hansen (LSAP), 8,706 votes; Camille Ney (CSV), 13,018 votes; Alex Wantz (DP), 6,416 votes; and Jean Winkin (CSV), 13,204 votes.

1964
Results of the 1964 general election held on 7 June 1964:

The following candidates were elected:
Victor Abens (LSAP), 11,629 votes; Henry Cravatte (LSAP), 13,643 votes; Henri Diederich (DP), 6,407 votes; Nicolas Ferring (CSV), 12,357 votes; Frankie Hansen (LSAP), 10,171 votes; Joseph Herr (CSV), 12,559 votes; Camille Ney (CSV), 13,792 votes; Georges Wagner (CSV), 14,200 votes; and Jean Winkin (CSV), 13,435 votes.

1950s

1959
Results of the 1959 general election held on 1 February 1959:

The following candidates were elected:
Victor Abens (LSAP), 11,264 votes; Henry Cravatte (LSAP), 13,327 votes; Henri Diederich (DP), 9,192 votes; Michel Ewen (LSAP), 10,496 votes; Nicolas Ferring (CSV), 14,500 votes; Henri Gengler (CSV), 13,930 votes; Joseph Herr (CSV), 14,269 votes; Jean Peusch (DP), 9,187 votes; Georges Wagner (CSV), 14,372 votes; and Jean Winkin (CSV), 14,655 votes.

1954
Results of the 1954 general election held on 30 May 1954:

The following candidates were elected:
Victor Abens (LSAP), 10,333 votes; Michel Ewen (LSAP), 10,012 votes; Nicolas Ferring (CSV), 17,600 votes; Henri Gengler (CSV), 18,505 votes; Joseph Herr (CSV), 18,024 votes; Jean Peusch (GD), 5,539 votes; Alphonse Schiltges (CSV), 17,674 votes; Tony Schmit (CSV), 17,264 votes; Georges Wagner (CSV), 21,347 votes; and Jean Winkin (CSV), 20,387 votes.

1951
Results of the 1951 general election held on 3 June 1951:

The following candidates were elected:
Victor Abens (LSAP), 10,484 votes; Auguste Delaporte (CSV), 15,244 votes; Michel Ewen (LSAP), 8,841 votes; Henri Gengler (CSV), 16,397 votes; Robert Schaffner (GD), 11,363 votes; Alphonse Schiltges (CSV), 14,872 votes; Tony Schmit (CSV), 15,815 votes; Joseph Simon (CSV), 17,475 votes; Georges Wagner (CSV), 19,518 votes; and Joseph Wenkin (GD), 7,762 votes.

1940s

1945
Results of the 1945 general election held on 21 October 1945:

The following candidates were elected:
Victor Abens (LAP), 6,242 votes; Auguste Delaporte (CSV), 21,135 votes; Henri Gengler (CSV), 19,486 votes; Nicolas Mathieu (GPD), 8,938 votes; Émile Reuter (CSV), 21,133 votes; Alphonse Schiltges (CSV), 16,696 votes; Tony Schmit (CSV), 17,838 votes; Joseph Simon (CSV), 22,885 votes; Georges Wagner (CSV), 18,385 votes; and Joseph Wenkin (GPD), 10,196 votes.

1930s

1937
Results of the 1937 general election held on 6 June 1937:

The following candidates were elected:
François Erpelding (LAP), 6,978 votes; Henri Gengler (RP), 18,864 votes; Antoine Hansen (RP), 16,063 votes; Nicolas Mathieu (LP), 5,110 votes; Charles Peffer (RP), 17,165 votes; Pierre Prüm (PBMA), 8,377 votes; Émile Reuter (RP), 19,872 votes; Jean-Pierre Schloesser (RP), 16,035 votes; Tony Schmit (RP), 16,960 votes; Joseph Simon (RP), 19,322 votes; and Etienne Weber (LAP), 6,232 votes.

1931
Results of the 1931 general election held on 7 June 1931:

The following candidates were elected:
Auguste Delaporte (RP), 14,783 votes; François Erpelding (LAP), 7,405 votes; Henri Gengler (RP), 17,488 votes; Antoine Hansen (RP), 14,801 votes; Eugène Hoffmann (BMP), 10,194 votes; Ernest Lamborelle (RP), 17,866 votes; Nicolas Mathieu (FDP), 7,123 votes; Nicolas Meyers (RP), 15,145 votes; Émile Reuter (RP), 18,804 votes; Joseph Simon (RP), 15,683 votes; and Jean-Pierre Wenkin (BMP), 7,223 votes.

1920s

1925
Results of the 1925 general election held on 1 March 1925:

The following candidates were elected:
Théodore Boever (ONP), 8,465 votes; Auguste Delaporte (RP), 14,755 votes; François Erpelding (LAP), 5,718 votes; Antoine Hansen (RP), 13,921 votes; Eugène Hoffmann (ORP), 11,426 votes; Ernest Lamborelle (RP), 15,458 votes; Nicolas Mathieu (ONP), 8,308 votes; Nicolas Meyers (RP), 15,503 votes; Egide Petges (RP), 13,551 votes; Pierre Prüm (ONP), 11,310 votes; and Émile Reuter (RP), 22,536 votes.

1922
Results of the 1922 general election held on 28 May 1922:

The following candidates were elected:
Théodore Boever (ONP), 10,046 votes; Auguste Delaporte (RP), 16,316 votes; François Erpelding (SP), 4,786 votes; Alphonse Greisch (ONP), 9,551 votes; Antoine Hansen (RP), 14,915 votes; Eugène Hoffmann (RP), 17,996 votes; Nicolas Klein (RP), 13,863 votes; Nicolas Mathieu (ONP), 9,438 votes; Nicolas Meyers (RP), 17,457 votes; Egide Petges (RP), 14,754 votes; Pierre Prüm (ONP), 10,888 votes; and Georges Thinnes (RP), 13,902 votes.

1910s

1919
Results of the 1919 general election held on 26 October 1919:

The following candidates were elected:
Théodore Boever (ONP), 10,569 votes; Auguste Delaporte (RP), 19,475 votes; François Erpelding (SP), 3,085 votes; Jean Gérard (RP), 16,633 votes; Antoine Hansen (RP), 17,866 votes; Eugène Hoffmann (RP), 20,507 votes; Mathias Jungers (RP), 16,548 votes; Nicolas Klein (RP), 16,577 votes; Bernard Krack (ONP), 7,178 votes; Nicolas Meyers (RP), 19,785 votes; Pierre Prüm (ONP), 10,597 votes; and Pierre Schiltz (RP), 20,026 votes.

References

1919 establishments in Luxembourg
Chamber of Deputies (Luxembourg) constituencies
Chamber of Deputies constituency
Constituencies established in 1919
Chamber of Deputies constituency
Chamber of Deputies constituency
Chamber of Deputies constituency
Chamber of Deputies constituency